Ningguo Road is a Shanghai Metro station located on Line 12 in Yangpu District, Shanghai.

References 

Railway stations in Shanghai
Line 12, Shanghai Metro
Shanghai Metro stations in Yangpu District
Railway stations in China opened in 2013